Jai Hanuman - Sankat Mochan Naam Tiharo is an Indian television mythology drama series that premiered from 23 August 2022 on Dangal TV. Produced by Alind Srivastava and Nissar Parvez under Peninsula Pictures, it stars Akshay Dogra, Madirakshi Mundle, Amar Upadhyay and Apara Mehta.

Plot

Cast  
 Akshay Dogra as Kali Yuga
 Madirakshi Mundle as Sita
 Amar Upadhyay  as Rama
 Apara Mehta as Maiya Kaki
 Aamir Dalvi as Sahasra Ravana 
 Ram Yashvardhan as Hanumaan
 Farnaz Shetty
 Abhishek Avasthi
 Yeshu Dhiman
 Romanch Mehta
 Karan Suchak as Lord Ram
 Nirbhay Wadhwa as Vali/Sugriva
 Radhika Chhabra
 Sanket Choukse
 Dinesh Mehta
 Atul Verma 
 Sayantani Ghosh as Parvathi
 Shreya Patel
 Shahbaz Khan as Bairavnath
 Rati Pandey as Devi Chaya /Devi Prabha

Production

Casting 
Initially, Anuj Sachdeva was in talks to play a cameo role, but decline due to his prior commitments.

Development 
The series was announced by Peninsula Pictures in August 2022 and confirmed by Dangal TV. It is mainly shot at the Film City, Mumbai.

Release 
Jai Hanuman - Sankat Mochan Naam Tiharo promos were released in August 2022. It premeried on 23 August 2022 on Dangal TV. It went off-air within 3 months of its premiere on 3 December 2022, due to low viewership.

See also 
 List of programmes broadcast by Dangal TV

References 

2022 Indian television series debuts
Indian television soap operas
Hindi-language television shows
Dangal TV original programming